Phyllis Trible (born October 25, 1932) is a feminist biblical scholar from Richmond, Virginia, United States. Trible's scholarship focuses on the Hebrew Bible and she is noted for her prominent influence on feminist biblical interpretation. Trible has written a multitude of books on interpretation of the Hebrew Bible, and has lectured around the world, including the United States, New Zealand, Australia, Japan, Canada, and a number of countries in Europe.

Biography
Born in Richmond, Virginia, Trible received her bachelor's degree at Meredith College in Raleigh, NC in 1954, and her doctoral degree from Union Theological Seminary/Columbia University in 1963. She wrote her doctoral dissertation at Union under James Muilenburg, who had generated a method of studying the Hebrew Bible based on form criticism that became known as rhetorical criticism, and whose approach Trible developed and applied throughout career, adding her own pioneering Christian feminist perspective to biblical scholarship.

Trible taught at Wake Forest University (1963–1971) and Andover Newton Theological School (1971–1979) before returning to Union Seminary, where she was appointed the Baldwin Professor of Sacred Literature in 1980. She left Union in 1998 to become Associate Dean and Professor of Biblical Studies of the then-new Wake Forest University School of Divinity in Winston-Salem, North Carolina.  She served in those roles until 2001, when she was appointed University Professor at Wake Forest, and served in that role until she retired in 2012.

Trible served as president of the Society of Biblical Literature in 1994. Athalya Brenner named her one of the "prominent matriarchs of contemporary feminist bible criticism," and claimed that Trible's 1973 article "Depatriarchalizing in Biblical Interpretation" ought to "be considered as the honoured mother of feminist Song of Songs scholarship." According to John J. Collins, "Phyllis Trible, more than any other scholar, put feminist criticism on the agenda of biblical scholarship in the 1970s."

In 1998, Trible donated her papers to The Burke Library's Archives of Women in Theological Scholarship at Columbia University; her papers formed the foundation of the collection. In recent years, Trible has served as a Visiting Professor of Old Testament at Union Theological Seminary in New York City. She taught a class in the fall of 2018 called "Entrances to Exodus."

Major themes 
Trible’s work is based on rhetorical criticism, examining the interpretation of biblical texts. She is known for her analysis of biblical narratives, particularly with regard to gender. According to P.K. Tull, there are two major themes that are central to all of her work: her respect for biblical text, and her commitment to equality for women.

Phyllis Trible’s interpretation of the creation of Adam and Eve is one of her most notable works. A major theme within “Depatriarchalizing in Biblical Interpretation” is Trible’s argument that the Bible has existed in a sexist context for centuries, which has distorted interpretations of the text. Trible writes that the Bible, when read against the contemporary patriarchal context, can be liberating for women. Another major takeaway from Trible’s most notable work is her agreement with some ancient Jewish Talmudists that—when analyzed using rhetorical criticism—language in the Bible suggests that Adam is androgynous until the female Eve is created. This argument has also been made by Riffat Hassan, a Pakistani-American theology professor, who also noted in her own writing that the language used to describe Adam within the biblical story is non-gendered. This understanding was a part of traditional Jewish Biblical exegesis going back to 300-500 C.E., and including Judaism's leading historical Biblical exegete, Rashi (1040-1105).

Criticism 
Trible’s work is based on rhetorical criticism, which focuses on looking at a text without the cultural context. Rhetorical critics believe that that is how one can find the meanings of any given text.

John J. Collins argued, in a response to Trible’s work, that interpreting a text without the cultural context that it lives in may not even be possible.

Ann M. Vater reinforces this criticism of Trible’s work, stating that “central figures always bear some cultural heritage.” 

Michael Carden takes a different angle, looking at who is left out in Trible’s advocacy for traditionally oppressed peoples in Christianity. Carden writes that in Texts of Terror, Trible fails to explain the treatment of homosexuals in Genesis 19.

Dianne Bergant claims, against the historical fact of ancient and Medieval Talmudic writings, that Trible's readings come from a contemporary point of view, and argues that the idea of an androgynous Adam seeks to solve gender parity, and does not actually look at what is written in the text.

Bibliography 
Selected articles
 
 
 
 
 
 

Books

References

External links
 Video interview by Susanne Scholz, recorded ca 2009, hosted at Scholz' website gathering oral history of feminist biblical scholars, Feminist Theologians Live.

1932 births
Living people
Union Theological Seminary (New York City) alumni
Union Theological Seminary (New York City) faculty
Wake Forest University faculty
Andover Newton Theological School faculty
Old Testament scholars
Feminist studies scholars
American biblical scholars
Meredith College alumni
Female biblical scholars
Christian feminist biblical scholars
People from Richmond, Virginia